The Matadi Bridge, also known as the OEBK Bridge for Organisation pour l’équipement de Banana-Kinshasa, and formerly known as Pont Maréchal in French, is a suspension bridge across the Congo River at Matadi, Democratic Republic of the Congo. It was completed in 1983 by a consortium of Japanese companies. The bridge crosses the Congo River at its narrowest point, just downstream from the port of Matadi. It is in fact the only bridge across the Congo River proper, the only other existing bridge being the Kongolo Bridge in Katanga which spans the Lualaba River, a tributary of the Congo.

Construction
Matadi Bridge was completed in 1983 by a consortium of Japanese companies, led by Ishikawajima-Harima Heavy Industries.
Matadi Bridge was built with 14,000 tons of steel. The bridge is designed in a way to emphasize that the towers are made up of bar members, with each tower being a single rigid frame. 25 million of the bridge was paid for by the Japanese government at the request of President Mobutu at a cost of 34.5 billion Japanese yen. During war time the bridge was guarded and still remains as of 2016.

Railway 
A railway line across the bridge was intended to be part of a line to Boma and Muanda. However, it has never been in operation.

See also 
 List of road-rail bridges

References

External links 
 

Suspension bridges in the Democratic Republic of the Congo
Matadi
Bridges completed in 1983
Bridges in the Democratic Republic of the Congo
Bridges over the Congo River
Democratic Republic of the Congo–Japan relations